Peter Jacobs  (born 26 September 1938) is a British 
épée fencer who competed at the Olympics.

Early and personal life
Jacobs was born in Pinner, Greater London, Great Britain, to Jewish parents. He attended Queens' College, Cambridge, where he studied Classics.

Fencing career
Jacobs was a three-time fencing Blue from 1960–62, and was on the winning team each time. In 1960, he became the first post-war undergraduate to win the UK’s oldest épée competition, the Miller-Hallett Cup. He also won the Universities Athletic Union épée title in 1961.

Having missed out on a medal by a single hit at the 1961 Summer Universiade in Sofia, Jacobs won the épée title two years later at the 1963 event in Porto Alegre, Brazil. In between the two Universiades he was a three times British fencing champion winning the épée title at the British Fencing Championships in 1962, 1964 and 1970.

In total, Jacobs won five British Empire/Commonwealth Games medals - a bronze medal in men's épée and a gold medal in team épée at the 1962 Commonwealth Games in Perth, Western Australia, team gold at the 1966 Commonwealth Games in Kingston, Jamaica and again at the 1970 Commonwealth Games in Edinburgh, where he also won an individual bronze medal.

Jacobs won one world championship medal, a team épée silver at the 1965 World Fencing Championships in Paris.

Jacobs competed in individual and team épée at the 1964 Summer Olympics in Tokyo, topping his pool in the first round with a 6–1 win–loss record. Four years later he again represented Great Britain in team épée at the 1968 Summer Olympics in Mexico City.

He went to a third Games in Montreal in 1976 as the Great Britain fencing captain. He was captain of the British épée team from 1971–76 and was the overall team manager from 1973–76.

Jacobs wrote the foreword to the book entitled Fencing: Techniques of Foil, Epee and Sabre by Brian Pitman (1988). He served on the Executive Committee of the Fédération Internationale d'Escrime (FIE) for 24 years, 12 as secretary-treasurer, and stepped down in 2013 and was elected to the Legal Commission. He was an A-graded FIE épée referee and worked on the Directoire Technique (DT) at multiple FIE world championships and Olympic Games.

He was appointed a Member of the Order of the British Empire (MBE) in the 2019 New Year Honours for services to British and International Fencing.

References

External links
 

1938 births
Living people
English Jews
British male fencers
People from Pinner
Sportspeople from London
Olympic fencers of Great Britain
Fencers at the 1964 Summer Olympics
Fencers at the 1968 Summer Olympics
Fencers at the 1962 British Empire and Commonwealth Games
Fencers at the 1966 British Empire and Commonwealth Games
Fencers at the 1970 British Commonwealth Games
Commonwealth Games medallists in fencing
Commonwealth Games gold medallists for England
Commonwealth Games bronze medallists for England
Universiade medalists in fencing
Universiade gold medalists for Great Britain
Medalists at the 1963 Summer Universiade
Jewish British sportspeople
Jewish male épée fencers
Alumni of Queens' College, Cambridge
Members of the Order of the British Empire
Medallists at the 1962 British Empire and Commonwealth Games
Medallists at the 1966 British Empire and Commonwealth Games
Medallists at the 1970 British Commonwealth Games